Olha Vasylivna Korobka (born December 7, 1985 Bobrovytsia, Ukrainian SSR, Soviet Union) is a Ukrainian weightlifter who was the European record holder in the snatch with 133 kg, and in the clean and jerk with 164 kg.

Career
Korobka ranked 7th in the women's over 75 kg category at the 2004 Summer Olympics.

On April 18, 2008, Korobka won her third straight European championship overall title in the women's over 75 kg category by lifting 277 kg in total (127 kg in the snatch, 150 kg in the clean and jerk).

At the 2008 Summer Olympics she initially won the silver medal in the +75 kg category, with a total of 277 kg. At a height of 1.81m (5' 11") and a weight of 167 kg (368 lbs), she was the heaviest female competitor at the Games.

Korobka won silver medal as superweight in the 2010 European Championship, at a bodyweight of 170 kg. (373 lb.). In February 2012, she was banned for four years for doping, being suspended until November 2015. She had failed a drugs test after the 2011 World Weightlifting Championships, where she won three bronze medals.

In 2016, she was stripped of her 2008 Olympic medal after a retest of her doping sample tested positive for steroids.

References

External links
  at beijing2008

1985 births
Living people
Ukrainian female weightlifters
Olympic weightlifters of Ukraine
Weightlifters at the 2004 Summer Olympics
Weightlifters at the 2008 Summer Olympics
Competitors stripped of Summer Olympics medals
Doping cases in weightlifting
Ukrainian sportspeople in doping cases
European Weightlifting Championships medalists
World Weightlifting Championships medalists
Sportspeople from Chernihiv Oblast
21st-century Ukrainian women